Bodhidharma   was a semi-legendary Buddhist monk who lived during the 5th or 6th century CE. He is traditionally credited as the transmitter of Chan Buddhism to China, and regarded as its first Chinese patriarch. According to a 17th-century apocryphal story found in a manual called Yijin Jing, he began the physical training of the monks of Shaolin Monastery that led to the creation of Shaolin kungfu. He is known as Dámó in China and as Daruma in Japan. His name means "dharma of awakening (bodhi)" in Sanskrit.

Little contemporary biographical information on Bodhidharma is extant, and subsequent accounts became layered with legend and unreliable details.

According to the principal Chinese sources, Bodhidharma came from the Western Regions, which typically refers to Central Asia but can also include the Indian subcontinent, and is described as either a "Persian Central Asian" or a "South Indian [...] the third son of a great Indian king."

Throughout Buddhist art, Bodhidharma is depicted as an ill-tempered, profusely-bearded, wide-eyed non-Chinese person. He is referred as "The Blue-Eyed Barbarian" in Chan texts.

Aside from the Chinese accounts, several popular traditions also exist regarding Bodhidharma's origins.

The accounts also differ on the date of his arrival, with one early account claiming that he arrived during the Liu Song dynasty (420–479 CE) and later accounts dating his arrival to the Liang dynasty (502–557 CE). Bodhidharma was primarily active in the territory of the Northern Wei (386–534 CE). Modern scholarship dates him to about the early 5th century CE.

Bodhidharma's teachings and practice centered on meditation and the Laṅkāvatāra Sūtra. The Anthology of the Patriarchal Hall (952) identifies Bodhidharma as the 28th Patriarch of Buddhism in an uninterrupted line that extends all the way back to the Gautama Buddha himself.

Biography

Principal sources 

There are two known extant accounts written by contemporaries of Bodhidharma. According to these sources, Bodhidharma came from the Western Regions, and is described as either a "Persian Central Asian" or a "South Indian [...] the third son of a great Indian king." Later sources draw on these two sources, adding additional details, including a change to being descendent from a Brahmin king, which accords with the reign of the Pallavas, who "claim[ed] to belong to a brahmin lineage."

The Western Regions was a historical name specified in the Chinese chronicles between the 3rd century BC to the 8th century AD that referred to the regions west of Yumen Pass, most often Central Asia or sometimes more specifically the easternmost portion of it (e.g. Altishahr or the Tarim Basin in southern Xinjiang). Sometimes it was used more generally to refer to other regions to the west of China as well, such as the Indian subcontinent (as in the novel Journey to the West).

The Record of the Buddhist Monasteries of Luoyang 

The earliest text mentioning Bodhidharma is The Record of the Buddhist Monasteries of Luoyang ( Luòyáng Qiélánjì) which was compiled in 547 by Yang Xuanzhi, a writer and translator of Mahayana sutras into Chinese. Yang gave the following account:

The account of Bodhidharma in the Luoyan Record does not particularly associate him with meditation, but rather depicts him as a thaumaturge capable of mystical feats. This may have played a role in his subsequent association with the martial arts and esoteric knowledge.

Tanlin – preface to the Two Entrances and Four Acts 

The second account was written by Tanlin (曇林; 506–574). Tanlin's brief biography of the "Dharma Master" is found in his preface to the Long Scroll of the Treatise on the Two Entrances and Four Practices, a text traditionally attributed to Bodhidharma and the first text to identify him as South Indian:

Tanlin's account was the first to mention that Bodhidharma attracted disciples, specifically mentioning Daoyu and Dazu Huike, the latter of whom would later figure very prominently in the Bodhidharma literature. Although Tanlin has traditionally been considered a disciple of Bodhidharma, it is more likely that he was a student of Huike.

Record of the Masters and Students of the Laṅka 
The Record of the Masters and Students of the Laṅka (Léngqié Shīzī Jì 楞伽師資記), which survives both in Chinese and in Tibetan translation (although the surviving Tibetan translation is apparently of older provenance than the surviving Chinese version), states that Bodhidharma is not the first ancestor of Zen, but instead the second. This text instead claims that Guṇabhadra, the translator of the Laṅkāvatāra Sūtra, is the first ancestor in the lineage. It further states that Bodhidharma was his student. The Tibetan translation is estimated to have been made in the late eighth or early ninth century, indicating that the original Chinese text was written at some point before that.

Tanlin's preface has also been preserved in Jingjue's (683–750) Lengjie Shizi ji "Chronicle of the Laṅkāvatāra Masters", which dates from 713 to 716./ca. 715 He writes,

"Further Biographies of Eminent Monks" 

In the 7th-century historical work "Further Biographies of Eminent Monks" (續高僧傳 Xù gāosēng zhuàn), Daoxuan possibly drew on Tanlin's preface as a basic source, but made several significant additions:

Firstly, Daoxuan adds more detail concerning Bodhidharma's origins, writing that he was of "South Indian Brahman stock" (南天竺婆羅門種 nán tiānzhú póluómén zhŏng).

Secondly, more detail is provided concerning Bodhidharma's journeys. Tanlin's original is imprecise about Bodhidharma's travels, saying only that he "crossed distant mountains and seas" before arriving in Wei. Daoxuan's account, however, implies "a specific itinerary": "He first arrived at Nan-yüeh during the Sung period. From there he turned north and came to the Kingdom of Wei" This implies that Bodhidharma had travelled to China by sea and that he had crossed over the Yangtze.

Thirdly, Daoxuan suggests a date for Bodhidharma's arrival in China. He writes that Bodhidharma makes landfall in the time of the Song, thus making his arrival no later than the time of the Song's fall to the Southern Qi in 479.

Finally, Daoxuan provides information concerning Bodhidharma's death. Bodhidharma, he writes, died at the banks of the Luo River, where he was interred by his disciple Dazu Huike, possibly in a cave. According to Daoxuan's chronology, Bodhidharma's death must have occurred prior to 534, the date of the Northern Wei's fall, because Dazu Huike subsequently leaves Luoyang for Ye. Furthermore, citing the shore of the Luo River as the place of death might possibly suggest that Bodhidharma died in the mass executions at Heyin in 528. Supporting this possibility is a report in the Chinese Buddhist canon stating that a Buddhist monk was among the victims at Héyīn.

Later accounts

Anthology of the Patriarchal Hall 

In the Anthology of the Patriarchal Hall (祖堂集 Zǔtángjí) of 952, the elements of the traditional Bodhidharma story are in place. Bodhidharma is said to have been a disciple of Prajñātāra, thus establishing the latter as the 27th patriarch in India. After a three-year journey, Bodhidharma reached China in 527, during the Liang (as opposed to the Song in Daoxuan's text). The Anthology of the Patriarchal Hall includes Bodhidharma's encounter with Emperor Wu of Liang, which was first recorded around 758 in the appendix to a text by Shenhui, a disciple of Huineng.

Finally, as opposed to Daoxuan's figure of "over 180 years," the Anthology of the Patriarchal Hall states that Bodhidharma died at the age of 150. He was then buried on Mount Xiong'er (熊耳山) to the west of Luoyang. However, three years after the burial, in the Pamir Mountains, Song Yun—an official of one of the later Wei kingdoms—encountered Bodhidharma, who claimed to be returning to India and was carrying a single sandal. Bodhidharma predicted the death of Song Yun's ruler, a prediction which was borne out upon the latter's return. Bodhidharma's tomb was then opened, and only a single sandal was found inside.

According to the Anthology of the Patriarchal Hall, Bodhidharma left the Liang court in 527 and relocated to Mount Song near Luoyang and the Shaolin Monastery, where he "faced a wall for nine years, not speaking for the entire time", his date of death can have been no earlier than 536. Moreover, his encounter with the Wei official indicates a date of death no later than 554, three years before the fall of the Western Wei.

Daoyuan – Transmission of the Lamp 
Subsequent to the Anthology of the Patriarchal Hall, the only dated addition to the biography of Bodhidharma is in the Jingde Records of the Transmission of the Lamp (景德傳燈錄 Jĭngdé chuándēng lù, published 1004 CE), by Daoyuan, in which it is stated that Bodhidharma's original name had been Bodhitāra but was changed by his master Prajñātāra. The same account is given by the Japanese master Keizan's 13th-century work of the same title.

Popular traditions 
Several contemporary popular traditions also exist regarding Bodhidharma's origins. An Indian tradition regards Bodhidharma to be the third son of a Pallava king from Kanchipuram. This is consistent with the Southeast Asian traditions which also describe Bodhidharma as a former South Indian Tamil prince who had awakened his kundalini and renounced royal life to become a monk. The Tibetan version similarly characterises him as a dark-skinned siddha from South India. Conversely, the Japanese tradition generally regards Bodhidharma as Persian.

Practice and teaching

Two Entrances and Four Practices 
Bodhidharma is traditionally seen as introducing a Mahayana Buddhist practice of dhyana (meditation) in China. According to modern scholars like the Japanese scholar of Chan Yanagida Seizan generally hold that the Two Entrances and Four Practices (二入四行論) is the only extant work that can be attributed to Bodhidharma and as such this is the main source for our knowledge of his teaching. 

According to this text, Bodhidharma taught two "entrances" to the Dharma. The first is a subitist teaching that directly apprehends the ultimate principle or true nature of reality (buddha-nature). The second entrance deals with four practices: (1) accepting all our sufferings as the fruit of past karma, (2) accept our circumstances with equanimity, (3) to be without craving, and (4) to let go of wrong thoughts and practice the six perfections.

According to Yanagida Seizan, the first "entrance of principle", was subitist teaching which derives from the sudden enlightenment thought of Tao-sheng, while the four practices are a reworking of the "four foundations of mindfulness", which were popular in the late Six Dynasties period Buddhist meditation circles.

Wall-gazing 

Tanlin, in the preface to Two Entrances and Four Practices, and Daoxuan, in the Further Biographies of Eminent Monks, mention a practice of Bodhidharma's termed "wall-gazing" (壁觀 bìguān). Both Tanlin and Daoxuan associate this "wall-gazing" with "quieting [the] mind".

In the Two Entrances and Four Practices, the term "wall-gazing" is given as follows:

Daoxuan states, "the merits of Mahāyāna wall-gazing are the highest". These are the first mentions in the historical record of what may be a type of meditation being ascribed to Bodhidharma. Exactly what sort of practice Bodhidharma's "wall-gazing" was remains uncertain. Nearly all accounts have treated it either as an undefined variety of meditation, as Daoxuan and Dumoulin, or as a variety of seated meditation akin to the zazen that later became a defining characteristic of Chan. The latter interpretation is particularly common among those working from a Chan standpoint.

There have also, however, been interpretations of "wall-gazing" as a non-meditative phenomenon.

The Laṅkāvatāra Sūtra 

There are early texts which explicitly associate Bodhidharma with the Laṅkāvatāra Sūtra. Daoxuan, for example, in a late recension of his biography of Bodhidharma's successor Huike, has the sūtra as a basic and important element of the teachings passed down by Bodhidharma:

Another early text, the "Record of the Masters and Disciples of the Laṅkāvatāra Sūtra" of Jingjue (淨覺; 683–750), also mentions Bodhidharma in relation to this text. Jingjue's account also makes explicit mention of "sitting meditation" or zazen:

In other early texts, the school that would later become known as Chan Buddhism is sometimes referred to as the "Laṅkāvatāra school" (楞伽宗 Léngqié zōng).

The Laṅkāvatāra Sūtra, one of the Mahayana sutras, is a highly "difficult and obscure" text whose basic thrust is to emphasize "the inner enlightenment that does away with all duality and is raised above all distinctions". It is among the first and most important texts for East Asian Yogācāra.

According to Suzuki, one of the recurrent emphases in the Laṅkāvatāra Sūtra is a lack of reliance on words to effectively express reality:

In contrast to the ineffectiveness of words, the sūtra instead stresses the importance of the "self-realization" that is "attained by noble wisdom" and, according to Suzuki, occurs "when one has an insight into reality as it is": "The truth is the state of self-realization and is beyond categories of discrimination". According to Suzuki, reflecting his own emphasis on kensho, the sūtra goes on to outline the ultimate effects of an experience of self-realization:

Legends about Bodhidharma 
Several stories about Bodhidharma have become popular legends, which are still being used in the Ch'an, Seon and Zen-tradition.

Encounter with Emperor Wu of Liang 
The Anthology of the Patriarchal Hall says that in 527, Bodhidharma visited Emperor Wu of Liang, a fervent patron of Buddhism:

This encounter was included as the first kōan of the Blue Cliff Record.

Nine years of wall-gazing 

Failing to make a favorable impression in South China, Bodhidharma is said to have travelled to the Shaolin Monastery. After either being refused entry or being ejected after a short time, he lived in a nearby cave, where he "faced a wall for nine years, not speaking for the entire time".

The biographical tradition is littered with apocryphal tales about Bodhidharma's life and circumstances. In one version of the story, he is said to have fallen asleep seven years into his nine years of wall-gazing. Becoming angry with himself, he cut off his eyelids to prevent it from happening again. According to the legend, as his eyelids hit the floor the first tea plants sprang up, and thereafter tea would provide a stimulant to help keep students of Chan awake during zazen.

The most popular account relates that Bodhidharma was admitted into the Shaolin temple after nine years in the cave and taught there for some time. However, other versions report that he "passed away, seated upright"; or that he disappeared, leaving behind the Yijin Jing; or that his legs atrophied after nine years of sitting, which is why Daruma dolls have no legs.

Huike cuts off his arm 
In one legend, Bodhidharma refused to resume teaching until his would-be student, Dazu Huike, who had kept vigil for weeks in the deep snow outside of the monastery, cut off his own left arm to demonstrate sincerity.

Transmission

Skin, flesh, bone, marrow 
Jingde Records of the Transmission of the Lamp (景德传灯录) of Daoyuan, presented to the emperor in 1004, records that Bodhidharma wished to return to India and called together his disciples:

Bodhidharma passed on the symbolic robe and bowl of dharma succession to Dazu Huike and, some texts claim, a copy of the Laṅkāvatāra Sūtra. Bodhidharma then either returned to India or died.

Bodhidharma at Shaolin 

Some Chinese myths and legends describe Bodhidharma as being disturbed by the poor physical shape of the Shaolin monks, after which he instructed them in techniques to maintain their physical condition as well as teaching meditation. He is said to have taught a series of external exercises called the Eighteen Arhat Hands and an internal practice called the Sinew Metamorphosis Classic. In addition, after his departure from the temple, two manuscripts by Bodhidharma were said to be discovered inside the temple: the Yijin Jing and the Xisui Jing. Copies and translations of the Yijin Jing survive to the modern day. The Xisui Jing has been lost.

Travels in Southeast Asia 

According to Southeast Asian folklore, Bodhidharma travelled from Jambudvipa by sea to Palembang, Indonesia. Passing through Sumatra, Java, Bali, and Malaysia, he eventually entered China through Nanyue. In his travels through the region, Bodhidharma is said to have transmitted his knowledge of the Mahayana doctrine and the martial arts. Malay legend holds that he introduced forms to silat.

Vajrayana tradition links Bodhidharma with the 11th-century south Indian monk Dampa Sangye who travelled extensively to Tibet and China spreading tantric teachings.

Appearance after his death 
Three years after Bodhidharma's death, Ambassador Song Yun of northern Wei is said to have seen him walking while holding a shoe at the Pamir Mountains. Song asked Bodhidharma where he was going, to which Bodhidharma replied "I am going home". When asked why he was holding his shoe, Bodhidharma answered "You will know when you reach Shaolin monastery. Don't mention that you saw me or you will meet with disaster". After arriving at the palace, Song told the emperor that he met Bodhidharma on the way. The emperor said Bodhidharma was already dead and buried and had Song arrested for lying. At Shaolin Monastery, the monks informed them that Bodhidharma was dead and had been buried in a hill behind the temple. The grave was exhumed and was found to contain a single shoe. The monks then said "Master has gone back home" and prostrated three times: "For nine years he had remained and nobody knew him; Carrying a shoe in hand he went home quietly, without ceremony."

Lineage

Construction of lineages 
The idea of a patriarchal lineage in Ch'an dates back to the epitaph for Faru, a disciple of the 5th patriarch Hongren. In the Long Scroll of the Treatise on the Two Entrances and Four Practices and the Continued Biographies of Eminent Monks, Daoyu and Dazu Huike are the only explicitly identified disciples of Bodhidharma. The epitaph gives a line of descent identifying Bodhidharma as the first patriarch.

In the 6th century biographies of famous monks were collected. From this genre the typical Chan lineage was developed:

D. T. Suzuki contends that Chan's growth in popularity during the 7th and 8th centuries attracted criticism that it had "no authorized records of its direct transmission from the founder of Buddhism" and that Chan historians made Bodhidharma the 28th patriarch of Buddhism in response to such attacks.

Six patriarchs 
The earliest lineages described the lineage from Bodhidharma into the 5th to 7th generation of patriarchs. Various records of different authors are known, which give a variation of transmission lines:

Continuous lineage from Gautama Buddha 
Eventually these descriptions of the lineage evolved into a continuous lineage from Śākyamuni Buddha to Bodhidharma. The idea of a line of descent from Śākyamuni Buddha is the basis for the distinctive lineage tradition of Chan Buddhism.

According to the Song of Enlightenment (證道歌 Zhèngdào gē) by Yongjia Xuanjue, one of the chief disciples of Huìnéng, was Bodhidharma, the 28th Patriarch of Buddhism in a line of descent from Gautama Buddha via his disciple Mahākāśyapa:
Mahakashyapa was the first, leading the line of transmission;
Twenty-eight Fathers followed him in the West;
The Lamp was then brought over the sea to this country;
And Bodhidharma became the First Father here
His mantle, as we all know, passed over six Fathers,
And by them many minds came to see the Light.
The Transmission of the Light gives 28 patriarchs in this transmission:

Modern scholarship 
Bodhidharma has been the subject of critical scientific research, which has shed new light on the traditional stories about Bodhidharma.

Biography as a hagiographic process 
According to John McRae, Bodhidharma has been the subject of a hagiographic process which served the needs of Chan Buddhism. According to him it is not possible to write an accurate biography of Bodhidharma:

McRae's standpoint accords with Yanagida's standpoint: "Yanagida ascribes great historical value to the witness of the disciple Tanlin, but at the same time acknowledges the presence of "many puzzles in the biography of Bodhidharma". Given the present state of the sources, he considers it impossible to compile a reliable account of Bodhidharma's life.

Several scholars have suggested that the composed image of Bodhidharma depended on the combination of supposed historical information on various historical figures over several centuries. Bodhidharma as a historical person may even never have actually existed.

Origins and place of birth 
Dumoulin comments on the three principal sources. The Persian heritage is doubtful, according to Dumoulin: "In the Description of the Lo-yang temple, Bodhidharma is called a Persian. Given the ambiguity of geographical references in writings of this period, such a statement should not be taken too seriously." Dumoulin considers Tanlin's account of Bodhidharma being "the third son of a great Brahman king" to be a later addition, and finds the exact meaning of "South Indian Brahman stock" unclear: "And when Daoxuan speaks of origins from South Indian Brahman stock, it is not clear whether he is referring to roots in nobility or to India in general as the land of the Brahmans."

These Chinese sources lend themselves to make inferences about Bodhidharma's origins. "The third son of a Brahman king" has been speculated to mean "the third son of a Pallava king". Based on a specific pronunciation of the Chinese characters 香至 as Kang-zhi, meaning “fragrance extreme", Tsutomu Kambe identifies 香至 to be Kanchipuram, an old capital town in the state Tamil Nadu, India. According to Tsutomu Kambe, "Kanchi means 'a radiant jewel' or 'a luxury belt with jewels', and puram means a town or a state in the sense of earlier times. Thus, it is understood that the '香至-Kingdom' corresponds to the old capital 'Kanchipuram'."

Acharya Raghu, in his work 'Bodhidharma Retold', used a combination of multiple factors to identify Bodhidharma from the state of Andhra Pradesh in South India, specifically to the geography around Mt. Sailum or modern day Srisailam.

The Pakistani scholar Ahmad Hasan Dani speculated that according to popular accounts in Pakistan's northwest, Bodhidharma may be from the region around the Peshawar valley, or possibly around modern Afghanistan's eastern border with Pakistan.

Caste 
In the context of the Indian caste system the mention of "Brahman king" acquires a nuance. Broughton notes that "king" implies that Bodhidharma was of caste of warriors and rulers. Brahman is, in western contexts, easily understood as Brahmana or Brahmin, which means priest.

Name 
According to tradition Bodhidharma was given this name by his teacher known variously as Panyatara, Prajnatara, or Prajñādhara. His name prior to monkhood is said to be Jayavarman.

Bodhidharma is associated with several other names, and is also known by the name Bodhitara. Faure notes that:

Tibetan sources give his name as "Bodhidharmottara" or "Dharmottara", that is, "Highest teaching (dharma) of enlightenment".

Abode in China 
Buswell dates Bodhidharma's abode in China approximately at the early 5th century. Broughton dates Bodhidharma's presence in Luoyang to between 516 and 526, when the temple referred to—Yongning Temple, was at the height of its glory. Starting in 526, Yǒngníngsì suffered damage from a series of events, ultimately leading to its destruction in 534.

Shaolin boxing 
The idea that Bodhidharma founded martial arts at the Shaolin Temple was spread in the 20th century, however, martial arts historians have shown this legend stems from a 17th-century qigong manual known as the Yijin Jing. The preface of this work says that Bodhidharma left behind the Yi Jin Jing, from which the monks obtained the fighting skills which made them gain some fame.

The authenticity of the Yijin Jing has been discredited by some historians including Tang Hao, Xu Zhen and Matsuda Ryuchi. According to Lin Boyuan, "This manuscript is full of errors, absurdities and fantastic claims; it cannot be taken as a legitimate source."

The oldest available copy was published in 1827. The composition of the text itself has been dated to 1624. Even then, the association of Bodhidharma with martial arts only became widespread as a result of the 1904–1907 serialization of the novel The Travels of Lao Ts'an in Illustrated Fiction Magazine. According to Henning, the "story is clearly a twentieth-century invention," which "is confirmed by writings going back at least 250 years earlier, which mention both Bodhidharma and martial arts but make no connection between the two."

Cultural legacy 

In the Zen kōan tradition, Bodhidharma is mentioned as a significant figure. In Dogen's 13th century kōan collection, the Shinji Shōbōgenzō, Bodhidharma is mentioned in fourteen different kōans. In The Gateless Gate by Wumen Huikai:

In a short addendum from 1245 CE, the text refers to a motto attributed to Bodhidharma: "Bodhidharma coming from the west, unattached to any words, pointing directly to the mind of man, advocated seeing into one's nature and becoming Buddha." The legend of Dazu Huike and Bodhidharma is recounted in case no. 41 of The Gateless Gate.

Bodhidharma's image became the inspiration for Japanese Daruma dolls, which originated in Meiwa-era Takasaki as good luck charms. A  is held at the Shorinzan Daruma Temple in Takasaki every year, celebrating the city as the birthplace of the Daruma doll. Over 400,000 attendants come to purchase new dolls. The Japanese version of the children's game statues is named .

A 1989 South Korean film, Why Has Bodhi-Dharma Left for the East?, derives its title from a kōan about Bodhidharma's legendary transmission of Chan Buddhism to China. The film screened at the 1989 Cannes Film Festival and was the first South Korean film to release theatrically in the United States. In 1994, the Hong Kong film Master of Zen (also known as Bodhidharma) adapted the legends of Bodhidharma's life into martial arts drama film, partly inspired by the master's association with Shaolin Kung Fu. The 2011 Indian Tamil science fiction martial arts film 7aum Arivu features a descendent of Bodhidharma as a main character and its plot focuses on the ancient monk's legendary skills and knowledge. The film was ultimately criticized for its historical inaccuracies in its portrayal of Bodhidharma (such as the monk's age upon entering China) and inappropriate emphasis of Bodhidharma as a Tamilian. The controversy caused hunger strikes among Indian followers of Bodhidharma.

Attributed works 
Modern scholars, such as the Japanese scholar of early Chan, Yanagida Seizan, agree that only one extant text can be attributed to Bodhidharma. This is the Two Entrances and Four Practices (二入四行論) also known as "Outline of Practice" (二種入 Er zhong ru), which is part of the larger "Bodhidharma Anthology" that also includes teachings from some of Bodhidharma's students, such as Huike and Dharma master Yuan.

There also exists a Dunhuang manuscript titled Treatise of Dhyana Master Bodhidharma (Tianzhu guo Putidamo chan shi lun 天竺國菩提達摩禪師論). According to McRae this text "might be taken as a guide to the teachings of early Ch'an. The text is probably relatively early, although its putative date of compilation or transcription, 681, is not reliable. Unfortunately, its contents do not lend themselves to precise dating."

Later attributions 
Throughout the history of Chan, various other works became attributed to Bodhidharma and modern scholars have studied these as well, attempting to understand their provenance.

Commonly attributed works include: 
 Treatise on the Destruction of Characteristics (《破相論》 Poxiang lun), also known as the Treatise on the Contemplation of the Mind (觀心論 Kuan-hsin lun), according to Yanagida, this is a work of Shenxiu.
 The Wake-up Treatise or Treatise on Realizing the Nature《悟性論 Wu-hsing lun》, according to Yanagida, this is a later reformulation of ideas of the East mountain teachings and respond to Shenhui's criticisms of the school.
 The Bloodstream Treatise (血脈論 Xuemai lun), according to Yanagida, this is a treatise by a member of the Oxhead school (7th-8th century) of Chan.
 The Genealogical Treatise (Hsueh-mo lun), this is a "post-Platform Sutra and immediately pre-Ma-tsu text" according to Yanagida which discusses the teaching that "does not posit words," and "seeing the nature and achieving buddhahood." 
 The Verses on the Heart Sutra, "a clearly apocryphal text" that introduces Yogacara ideas associated with Xuanzang's translations into Chan.

Pointing directly to one's mind 
One of the fundamental Chán texts attributed to Bodhidharma is a four-line stanza whose first two verses echo the Laṅkāvatāra Sūtras disdain for words and whose second two verses stress the importance of the insight into reality achieved through "self-realization":

The stanza, in fact, is not Bodhidharma's, but rather dates to the year 1108.

See also 
 Chinese Buddhism
 Silk Road transmission of Buddhism
 Buddhism amongst Tamils
 Kanchipuram
 Why Has Bodhi-Dharma Left for the East?
 7aum Arivu
 Buddhabhadra
 Dongdu ji

Notes

References

Sources

Printed sources 

 
 
 
 
 
 
 
 
 
 
 
 
 
 
 
  note 32.
 
 
 
 
 
 
 .
 
 
 
 .
 
 
 
 
 
 
 .
 
 
 .
 .
 
 
 
 
 
 
 
 
 
 .

Web sources

Further reading

External links 

 Essence of Mahayana Practice By Bodhidharma, with annotations. Also known as "The Outline of Practice." translated by Chung Tai Translation Committee
 Bodhidharma

1
Martial arts school founders
Northern Wei Buddhists
Indian Buddhist missionaries
People of Central Asian descent
Liang dynasty Buddhist monks
Translators to Chinese
Founders of religions
Indian Buddhist monks
Indian Buddhists
Northern Wei Buddhist monks
Founders of Buddhist sects
Shaolin Temple
Indian scholars of Buddhism
Indian royal advisors
Tamil
Missionary linguists